2K19 may refer to:

 the year 2019
 NBA 2K19, video game
 WWE 2K19, video game